The 2011–12 USHL season is the 33rd season of the United States Hockey League as an all-junior league. The regular season began on September 30, 2011, and concluded on April 14, 2012, with the regular season champion winning the Anderson Cup.

The playoffs began on April 16, 2012, and completed on May 23, 2012.  The top six teams from each conference competed for the Clark Cup.

This season was the 20th season in which the same team captured both the Anderson Cup and the Clark Cup in the same season.  It was the third time the Green Bay Gamblers accomplished this feat (1995–96, 2009–10, and the 2011–12 seasons).

Regular season
Final standings reflect games played through April 14, 2012

Note: GP = Games played; W = Wins; L = Losses; OTL = Overtime losses; SL = Shootout losses; GF = Goals for; GA = Goals against; PTS = Points; x = clinched playoff berth; y = clinched conference title; z = clinched regular season title

Eastern Conference

Western Conference

Players
Final statistics reflect games played through April 14, 2012

Scoring leaders
Note: GP = Games played; G = Goals; A = Assists; Pts = Points; +/- = Plus/Minus Rating; PIM = Penalty minutes

Leading goaltenders
Note: GP = Games played; Mins = Minutes played; W = Wins; L = Losses: OTL = Overtime losses; SL = Shootout losses; GA = Goals Allowed; SO = Shutouts; SV% = Save percentage; GAA = Goals against average

Clark Cup Playoffs

Conference Quarterfinals

Eastern Conference

(3) Dubuque Fighting Saints vs. (6) Team USA

(4) Youngstown Phantoms vs. (5) Cedar Rapids RoughRiders

Western Conference

(3) Waterloo Black Hawks vs. (6) Tri-City Storm

(4) Fargo Force vs. (5) Sioux City Musketeers

Conference semifinals

Eastern Conference

(1) Green Bay Gamblers vs. (4) Youngstown Phantoms

(2) Indiana Ice vs. (3) Dubuque Fighting Saints

Western Conference

(1) Lincoln Stars vs. (4) Fargo Force

(2) Omaha Lancers vs. (3) Waterloo Black Hawks

Conference finals

Eastern Conference

(1) Green Bay Gamblers vs. (2) Indiana Ice

Western Conference

(1) Lincoln Stars vs. (3) Waterloo Black Hawks

Clark Cup Finals
Note 1: All times are local.
Note 2: Game times in italics signify games to be played only if necessary.
Note 3: Home team is listed first.

(E1) Green Bay Gamblers vs. (W3) Waterloo Black Hawks

Playoff Statistics
Statistics reflect games played through May 23, 2012

Scoring leaders
Note: GP = Games played; G = Goals; A = Assists; Pts = Points; +/- = Plus/Minus Rating; PIM = Penalty minutes

Leading goaltenders
Note: GP = Games played; Mins = Minutes played; W = Wins; L = Losses: OTL = Overtime losses; SL = Shootout losses; GA = Goals Allowed; SO = Shutouts; SV% = Save percentage; GAA = Goals against average

USHL Awards

All-USHL teams

First Team

Second Team

All-Rookie Team

External links
 Official website of the United States Hockey League

References

USHL
United States Hockey League seasons